Bakhti (also Romanized as Bakhtī) is a village in Shivanat Rural District, Afshar District, Khodabandeh County, Zanjan Province, Iran. At the 2006 census, its population was 231, in 56 families.

References 

Populated places in Khodabandeh County